Kalinda Ashton is an Australian writer based in Melbourne, Victoria. She is the author of the 2009 novel The Danger Game and was joint winner of the 2012 Sydney Morning Herald best young novelist award and a Betty Trask award in the UK.

In 2010 Ashton received an Australia Council Literature Board Grant for Developing Writers. She is an associate editor of the literary journal, Overland.

References

Living people
21st-century Australian novelists
Academic staff of Flinders University
Australian women novelists
Communist women writers
21st-century Australian women writers
Year of birth missing (living people)